Forge FC is a Canadian professional soccer club based in Hamilton, Ontario. The club was founded in 2017 by Hamilton Tiger-Cats owner Bob Young as part of a larger effort with the Canadian Soccer Association that resulted in the creation of the Canadian Premier League.

The club began play on April 27, 2019 in the CPL's inaugural match against York9 FC. In addition to the CPL, Forge FC has competed in the Canadian Championship, the CONCACAF League, and the CONCACAF Champions League.

This list encompasses the honours won by Forge FC and records set by the club, its players, and its manager.

Honours
 Canadian Premier League
Champions (3): 2019, 2020, 2022
Runners-up (1): 2021
Regular season champions (1): 2021
Runners-up (2): 2019, 2022

 Canadian Championship
Runners-up (1): 2020

Player records

Appearances 

Bold signifies current Forge FC player

Goalscorers 

Bold signifies current Forge FC player

Clean sheets 

Bold signifies current Forge FC player

Team records

Firsts
First CPL match: Forge FC 1–1 York9 FC, April 27, 2019
First CPL win: Forge FC 3–0 Pacific FC, May 8, 2019
First Canadian Championship match: Forge FC 1–1 Cavalry FC, June 4, 2019
First CONCACAF League match and win: Forge FC 2–1 Antigua GFC, August 1, 2019
First Canadian Championship win: Forge FC 2–1 Valour FC, September 15, 2021
First CONCACAF Champions League match: Forge FC 0–1 Cruz Azul, February 16, 2022

Record wins
Record CPL win: 4 matches
Forge FC 4–0 Atlético Ottawa, August 25, 2021
HFX Wanderers 0–4 Forge FC, May 20, 2022
Forge FC 5–1 FC Edmonton, July 19, 2022
Atlético Ottawa 0–4 Forge FC, July 31, 2022
Record CONCACAF League win: Forge FC 3–0 Santos de Guápiles, November 2, 2021

Record defeats
Record CPL defeat: York9 FC 4–0 Forge FC, October 12, 2019
Record CONCACAF League defeat: Olimpia 4–1 Forge FC, August 29, 2019
Record CONCACAF Champions League defeat: Cruz Azul 3–1 Forge FC, February 24, 2022

Highest scores
 Highest scoring CPL game: 7 goals, FC Edmonton 3–4 Forge FC, May 31, 2022
 Highest scoring CONCACAF League game: 5 goals, Olimpia 4–1 Forge FC, August 29, 2019
 Highest scoring CONCACAF Champions League game: 4 goals, Cruz Azul 3–1 Forge FC, February 24, 2022

Record attendances
Highest attendance at Tim Hortons Field: 17,611, against York9 FC, April 27, 2019

Coaching records

Domestic results

By competition

By club

International results

By competition

By club

By country

By season

Global records 
On May 12, 2019, Forge hosted Cavalry FC at Tim Hortons Field in the first men's top-level professional soccer game in the world refereed by an all-women staff.

References 

Forge FC
Forge